Native carrot is a common name for several plants and may refer to:

 Daucus glochidiatus
 Several species of Geranium, including:
 Geranium potentilloides
 Geranium solanderi, native to Australia and New Zealand